Hovedstadens Sygehusfællesskab (H:S) was a Danish health trust which was founded on 1 January 1995 to run health care services in Copenhagen and Frederiksberg. There were five hospitals under its command.

After the structural reform, Hovedstadens Sygehusfællesskab was closed down, and from 2006, its responsibilities were passed to Region Hovedstaden.

References

 Lov nr. 537 af 24-06-2005 om regioner og om nedlæggelse af amtskommunerne, Hovedstadens Udviklingsråd og Hovedstadens Sygehusfællesskab
Lov nr. 1132 af 21-12-1994 om Hovedstadens Sygehusfællesskab (historisk)
Region Hovedstaden
H:S' hjemmeside er nedlagt etter strukturreformen. En tidligere kopi kan sees på Internet Archive Wayback Machine

1995 establishments in Denmark
2006 disestablishments in Denmark
Organizations established in 1995
Organizations disestablished in 2006
Hospital networks
Hospitals in Denmark
Organizations based in Copenhagen
History of Copenhagen